In the Pursuit of Leisure is the fifth studio album by American rock band Sugar Ray, released in 2003. Singer-songwriter Esthero and reggae singer Shaggy both make guest appearances.

It features the single "Mr. Bartender (It's So Easy)", a song which includes samples from both Sweet's hit "Love Is Like Oxygen" and Midnight Star's hit "No Parking (On the Dance Floor)." That track was a success and reached the #20 spot on Billboard's Adult Top 40. A cover of Joe Jackson's new wave song "Is She Really Going Out With Him?" was released as the second single. It had similar success and reached the #29 spot on Billboard's Adult Top 40.

Reception and sales
Stephen Thomas Erlewine of AllMusic awarded it four out of five stars, calling it "another winning record by a band who has proven to be far more resilient than anybody could have guessed when 'Fly' flew to the top of the charts in 1997."

The album only sold 135,000 copies, far less than the band's prior self-titled release, which had gone platinum. The album's commercial failure led to a six-year gap in releasing their next album.

Track listing

Credits

Sugar Ray
Sugar Ray ― songwriting (1, & 3-11)
Mark McGrath – lead vocals
Rodney Sheppard – guitar, backing vocals
Murphy Karges – bass, backing vocals
DJ Homicide – turntables, samples, programming; keyboards, backing vocals
Stan Frazier – drums, percussion, backing vocals

Additional personnel

Songwriting on "Is She Really Going Out with Him?"
Joe Jackson

Guest vocalists
Esthero – "Heaven" 
ProHoeZak (Simon McKinley) –  "Mr. Bartender (It's So Easy)"
Shaggy – "56 Hope Road"

References

External links 
 

Sugar Ray albums
2003 albums
Atlantic Records albums
Albums produced by David Kahne